Lillian Soucy (née Provost, died 1990) was a member of the New Hampshire House of Representatives. She was the mother of President of the New Hampshire Senate Donna Soucy and was the wife of Manchester alderman C. Arthur Soucy.

References

Year of birth unknown
1990 deaths
20th-century American women politicians
20th-century American politicians
Women state legislators in New Hampshire
Members of the New Hampshire House of Representatives